Cloudike is an on-premise software product developed by Cloudike Inc., a San Francisco based company. The product enables cloud storage service from inside the customer’s data center & network. Usually, it is used by telco and consumer electronics companies to launch local alternatives to Apple iCloud, Google Drive + Photos + Contacts, Dropbox under their own brand and name.

History
Cloudike Inc started in 2009 as a developer of Software as a Service platform that grew into a multi-tier cloud service used to build on-premise white-label enterprise data storages for OEMs, Mobile and Internet service providers, consumer electronics distributors and fintech companies.

See also
 Comparison of file hosting services
 Comparison of online backup services
 Comparison of file synchronization software

References

External links
Official Website
TechCrunch Review
Cloudike Medium Blog
Cloud Rendering Service

Cloud applications
Data synchronization
File sharing software
Online backup services
File hosting for macOS
File hosting for Windows